Belocephalus sleighti, known as the Keys short-winged conehead katydid, is a species of katydid that is endemic to the United States.

References

External links
Walker, T. J. Sound files: Calling song of Belocephalus sleighti. Singing Insects of North America. Entomology & Nematology. University of Florida IFAS.

Insects of the United States
Tettigoniidae
Taxonomy articles created by Polbot
Insects described in 1914